Aleksey Vladimirovich Tarnovitski (born 20 February 1955), better known as Aleks Tarn, is a journalist and author who was born in the Russian Far East, Primorsky Krai. He grew up, studied and worked in Leningrad. Since 1989, he has lived in Beit Aryeh-Ofarim.

Biography
Tarn began his literary career relatively late – in 2002. Tarn's articles on cultural and political topic were published in Russian language Israeli and American news outlets. In 2015, Aleks Tarn was awarded Yuri Stern Prize for Literature “for special contribution to society and culture”.

Works
When newly arrived in Israel, Tarn wrote his first novel The Protocols of the Elders of Zion, a combination philosophical parable, parody, and thriller. The main protagonist is a James Bond like, semi-farcical man of action, whose activities are set in the reality of Israeli life at the time of the sharpening of the crisis in Arab-Israeli conflict. The novel was published in the 16th edition of Jerusalem Journal. Tarn was awarded a prize from the "Jerusalem Journal", as an author of the most promising literary work of 2003. The novel was praised by Moscow-based literary critic Mikhail Edelstein for the author's original thinking and juxtaposition of opposites.

In the Summer of 2004, the novel was published as a separate book (publisher "Culture Bridges – Gesharim", Moscow). A second novel - Quasimodo, a novel about a dog with almost human consciousness, came out the same year. Moscow literary critic, Danila Davidov, reviewed the novel in the journal of "Biblio – Globus", describing it as "a rather funny story about Israeli bums, a novel gradually transforms into a parable of retribution". It received critical praise from 
Kira Cherkavsky, a journalist of the radio station Echo of Moscow and from poet and a literary critic Anatoly Dobrovich.

A magazine edition of Tarn's third novel Jonah was published in the 19th Jerusalem Journal, and received a generally favourable review by Leonid Gomberg, a literary critic, in the April 2005 editions of Alef magazine.
In 2006, a Moscow publishing houses, "Olympus" and AST (publisher) published Tarn's trilogy about Berl, the main protagonist of which is known to the reader from the novel "The Protocols of the Elders of Zion". The three books were titled "They always come back", "G-d does not play dice" and "I will bring you back". A magazine edition of the second book of the trilogy named "Ashes" – was published in the 22nd "Jerusalem Journal".

A novel Ashes was included in the final six competitors of the Russian Booker Prize-2007,

A philosopher and a culture researcher, Dr. Dina Ratner, dedicated to Aleks Tarn's literary works a separate chapter in her monograph Search for G-d – search for yourself".

In June 2008, the publishing house Eksmo published Tarn’s satirical fantasy To steal Lenin. In the book, four friends who get together after a long break, steal Lenin’s mummy from the Mausoleum. In 2012, the novel was translated into Slovakian and published in Bratislava by the "Marenčin" publishing house.

The same year, Jerusalem Journal published his story "The Dome" (No.25) and a novel "The Notes of Puppeteer" (No.27).

A novel "Girshuni", written in the form of internet blogs, was included in the best ten novels of Russian speaking diaspora, according to the list from "Russian Award"in 2008. The novel received critical acclaim from Moscow critic Boris Kuzminsky.

A year later the same appraisal of "Russian Award" (included in the ten best novels) was given to "Dor" – another Tarn's novel which was published in 'Jerusalem Journal'

A story "Last Kain" became the laureate of the Mark Aldanov’s literary reward "For the best story of Russian speaking diaspora" that is given by New York's magazine New Journal"(2009).

In 2010, Moscow s publisher "Enneagon" published Tarn's novel The Book, about the Dead Sea Scrolls. This novel presents an unusual view of the beginning of Christianity. Moscow cultural scientist, Yuri Tabak praised Tarn's "masterful craftsmanship".

In addition to his novels and journalistic articles, Aleks Tarn is also an author of several theater plays, literary scenarios as well as a poetry book "Antiblok" that was published in Israel in 1991.

Since 1989, he has been living in Israel, in the Samaria settlement of Beit Arye.

See also
 Russian Booker Prize

References

External links
 Shomron's Hills Aleks Tarn's personal website (Russian)
 Aleks Tarn's page on the «Jerusalem Journal»'s website (Russian)
 Aleks Tarn's page on the «Russian magazines» website (Russian)
 Aleks Tarn's page in the Maksim Moshkow's web library (Russian)
 Анатолий Добрович: Алекс Тарн. Услышан ли литератор? Orlita magazine (Russian) 
 Михаил Эдельштейн: Не фраер Review in the Booknik magazine (Russian)
 Данила Давыдов: Чуткость к незримому Review in the Biblio-Globus magazine (Russian) 
 Михаил Эдельштейн: Берл. Берл Бонд Review in the Lechaim magazine (Russian) 
 Данила Давыдов: Чуткость к незримому Review in the Biblio-Globus magazine (Russian) 
 Семен Чарный: Сага о псе Review in the Nezavivsimaja Gazeta (Russian) 
 Евгений Белжеларский: Роман Алекса Тарна поспорит за Букера Review in the Itogi magazine (Russian) 
 Михаил Эдельштейн: Черно-белое кино Review in the Lechaim magazine (Russian) 
 Леонид Гомберг: Змеиное Гнездо Ниневии Review in the Alef magazine (Russian) 
 Данила Давыдов: Теория инсценировки Review in the Lechaim magazine (Russian) 
 Ася Энтова: О романе Алекса Тарна «Облордоз» Review in the Vesti newspaper (Russian) 
 Финалист премии Русский Букер «украл Ленина» Review in the Pravda.ru magazine (Russian) 
 Peter Brezňan: Lenin ožíva, revolúcia môže konečne znovu povstať! Review in the Feel Art magazine (Slovak) 
 Martin Kasarda: Ukradnúť Lenina - groteska o chromom svete Review in the Kultura magazine (Slovak) 
 Denisa Oravcová: Aleks Tarn - Ukradnúť Lenina (recenzia) Review in the Birdz magazine (Slovak)

Living people
1955 births
Israeli novelists
Jewish writers
Israeli Jews